Baby  is a village in the administrative district of Gmina Moszczenica, within Piotrków County, Łódź Voivodeship, in central Poland.

The village has a population of 799. It was the site of a 2011 train derailment in which one passenger was killed and 81 injured.

References

Villages in Piotrków County